A Time For Miracles is a 1980 American made-for-television biographical drama film chronicling the life story of America's first native born saint, Elizabeth Ann Bayley Seton. It was produced by ABC Circle Films for the American Broadcasting Company and telecast December 21, 1980, as a Christmas special. The film was created by Beverlee Dean and directed by Michael O'Herlihy. The script was written by Henry Denker with collaboration with Sister Mary Hilaire and filmed in Georgia. A Time For Miracles starred Ryan's Hope and Star Trek: Voyager actress Kate Mulgrew as Elizabeth Seton. John Forsythe and Lorne Greene also star.

Plot
Elizabeth Bayley Seton (1774-1821) is a happily married New York Episcopalian socialite and mother of five whose life gets turned around after her husband, William Seton, dies of consumption in Italy after his shipping business went bankrupt. As a widow with five children, she opens a small school in an effort to support herself and family.

She decides to convert to Catholicism, much to the protest and distaste of her friends and family. As a social outcast, she is left with nothing so she and her daughters took refuge in Baltimore. Under the wing of John Carroll, the first American Catholic bishop, she opens a school, establishes a religious routine and takes religious vows, thus becoming `Mother Seton.' Eventually she, her daughter, and a band of young women who have joined her rattle west in a covered wagon into the countryside, to Emmitsburg, Maryland., where, on an initial diet of salt pork and carrot coffee, she sets up a school and a convent for her growing sisterhood, Sisters of Charity. She dies from consumption at 46.
The Roman Catholic Church requires 2 attested miracles to become a saint and 3 were attributed to Mother Seton. Mother Seton was canonized in 1975.

Cast
 Kate Mulgrew .... Mother Elizabeth Bayley Seton
 Jean-Pierre Aumont .... Father DuBois
 Rossano Brazzi .... Fillipo Fillici
 John Forsythe .... Postulator
 Lorne Greene .... Bishop John Carroll
 Jean LeClerc .... Father Brute
 Leonard Mann .... Antonio Fillici
 Robin Clarke .... William Seton
 William Prince .... Prefect
 Dominic Chianese .... Promoter
 Timothy Patrick Murphy .... Will
 Hoolihand Burke .... Maria
 Sherrie Wills .... Veronica
 Everett McGill .... The Farmer
 Fred Rolf .... Goldsmith
 Leonardo Cimino .... Italian Priest
 Chiara Peacock .... Anna
 Nan Mason .... Rose White
 Penelope Allen .... The Farmer's Wife
 Ellen Barber .... Amabilia Filicchi
 Roy Cooper .... O'Connoway
 George Murdock
 Milo O'Shea
 Michael Higgins
 Diane Kagan
 Danny Moran
 Jon Adams
 Doug Johnson
 Sharon Foote
 Erica Katz
 Amy Linker
 Todd Fine
 Travis Fine
 Don Devendorf .... Ship Owner (uncredited)

External links
 A Time For Miracles on the Internet Movie Database
 A Time For Miracles on Amazon.com
 A Time For Miracles on Totally Kate
 A Time For Miracles on marianland.com
 St. Elizabeth Ann Seton Article about both Seton and A Time For Miracles
 

American television films
1980 television films
1980 films
ABC network original films
Christmas television specials
Films directed by Michael O'Herlihy